Dead Ball Zone is a 1998 video game developed by Rage Games and published by GT Interactive. A PC version was released under the alternative name Savage arena.

Reception

Absolute PlayStation rated the game a 7.4 of 10 stating that "It's difficult to imagine what type of audience Dead Ball Zone is being aimed at.  The fighting is basically a few over-the-top tackles and the sport is a combination of handball/basketball and football."

Sales
According to GT Interactive, the game had strong sales.

References 

1998 video games
Fantasy sports video games
Rage Games games
PlayStation (console) games
Video games developed in the United Kingdom
Video games set in the future